Nabil G. Seidah,  (born 1949) is a Canadian Québécois scientist. Born in Egypt, he was educated at Cairo University, and subsequently at Georgetown University where he obtained his Ph.D. in 1973.  He emigrated to Canada and has been working at the Clinical Research Institute of Montreal (IRCM) since 1974. He is the director of the laboratory of Biochemical Neuroendocrinology. He discovered and cloned seven (PC1, PC2, PC4, PC5, PC7, SKI-1 and PCSK9) of the nine known enzymes belonging to the convertase family. During this period, he also greatly contributed to demonstrating that the proteolysis by the proprotein convertases is a wide mechanism that also concerns “non-neuropeptide” proteins such as growth factors, α-integrins, receptors, enzymes, membrane-bound transcription factors, and bacterial and viral proteins. In 2003, he discovered PCSK9 and showed that point mutations in the PCSK9 gene cause dominant familial hypercholesterolemia, likely because of a gain of function related to the ability of PCSK9 to enhance the degradation of cell surface receptors, such as the low-density lipoprotein receptor (LDLR). He has since worked on the elucidation of the functions and mechanisms of action of PCSK9 and PCSK7 both in cells and in vivo, and is developing specific PCSK9 and PCSK7 inhibitors/silencers.

Awards
 1977 - The Clarke Institute of Psychiatry Award
 1983 - Marcel-Piché Prize 
 1991 - Made Fellow of the Royal Society of Canada
 1994 - Manning Award of Distinction
 1995 - Medical Research Council Distinguished Scientist Award
 1997 - Made Officer of the Ordre national du Québec
 1999 - Made member of the Order of Canada
 1999 - Medal of Honor, Pharmaceutical Manufacturers Association of Canada (PMAC) Health Research Foundation 
 2001 - Winner of the McLaughlin medal 
 2001 - Winner of the Léo-Pariseau Prize
 2003-2024 - Canada Chair Tier 1 in Precursor Proteolysis
 2009 - Pfizer Distinguished Cardiovascular-Metabolic Research Jean-Davignon Award
 2011 - Wilder-Penfield Prize in Biomedical Research in Québec
 2013 - Queen Elizabeth II Diamond Jubilee Medal
 2013 - Simon Pierre-Noël Memorial Lecture Award in Lipid Research 
 2014 - Jacques Genest Award from the Canadian Society of Endocrinology & Metabolism  
 2015 - Anne and Neil McArthur Research Award
 2016 - CIHR Distinguished Lecturer Award in Cardiovascular Sciences
 2018 - Grand Prix scientifique de la Fondation Lefoulon-Delalande
 2018 - Akira Endo Award
 2018 - Lucian Award
 2021 - Elected member of the Canadian Academy of Health Sciences [CAHS]

References

1949 births
Living people
Scientists from Montreal
Egyptian scientists
Egyptian chemists
Fellows of the Royal Society of Canada
Members of the Order of Canada
Officers of the National Order of Quebec
Cairo University alumni
Georgetown University alumni
Canadian biochemists
20th-century Canadian scientists
21st-century Canadian scientists